Richard Karlan (April 24, 1919 – September 10, 2004) was an American actor. He appeared in the films Snow Dog, Union Station, Between Midnight and Dawn, The Lemon Drop Kid, Love Is Better Than Ever, The Racket, Wait till the Sun Shines, Nellie, Tangier Incident, Blowing Wild, All the Brothers Were Valiant, Captain Kidd and the Slave Girl, Abbott and Costello Meet the Mummy, The Steel Jungle, Accused of Murder, Hollywood or Bust, Rock All Night, The Crooked Circle, The Man Who Died Twice, Inside the Mafia and Star!, among others.

He died of pneumonia on September 10, 2004, in Los Angeles, California at age 85.

Filmography

References

External links
 
 

1919 births
2004 deaths
20th-century American male actors
American male film actors
Deaths from pneumonia in California